The Notitia provinciarum et civitatum Africae ("Notice of the Provinces and Cities of Africa") is a Byzantine-era document listing the bishops and sees in the Roman provinces of North Africa, Sardinia and the Balearics.
The cause of its preparation was the council of Carthage held on 1 February 484 by the Arian king of the Vandals, Huneric (477–484).

It is arranged according to provinces in the following order: Proconsularis, Numidia, Byzacena, Mauretania Caesariensis, Mauretania Sitifensis, Tripolitana and Sardinia. It also names exiled bishops and vacant sees, and is an important authority for the history of the early African church and the geography of these provinces. It is preserved in the sole extant manuscript containing the History of the Vandal Persecution by Bishop Victor of Vita.

Description

The Notitia provinciarum and civitatum Africae is the conventional long title in Latin, but it is also known simply as the Notitia Africae (NA).

The Notitia lists the Chalcedonian (Catholic) bishops (nomina episcorum catholicorum) who participated in the council held at Carthage on 1 February 484, as well as those who were victims of the Vandal Persecution and those who were exiled or fled (fugerunt). It also by implication describes the extent of the Vandal Kingdom at that time.

It lists four hundred and eighty-three dioceses in seven ecclesiastical provinces, five of which correspond to Roman provinces. The order of the provinces seems to follow the chronological order of their creation: 
The first list is the Proconsularis (or Zeugitana), which includes the diocese of Carthage, whose bishop is the primate of Africa.
The second list is that of Numidia, the first bishop of which, Secundus of Tigisis, is attested in 305.
The third list is that of Byzacena, which had a bishop by the middle of the 4th century. 
The fourth list is that of Mauretania Caesariensis, the provincial seat of which might go back to the 4th century and the acts of the council of Carthage (407). 
The fifth is a list of Mauretania Sitifensis, which was set up after the general council of Africa held at Hippo on 8 October 393.
The sixth list is that of Tripolitania.
Sardinia is not presented as a province but as an island. The list also contains the names of the Bishops of Majorca and Menorca, in the Balearic Islands.

The author of the Notitia is unknown. It has long been attributed, wrongly, to Victor of Vita, and its author is designated, by convention, as Pseudo-Victor.

Bishops named in the Notitia
 Fulgentius of Ruspe and Stephen
 Tiberiumus
 Paschasius
 Aemilianus
 Amourah
 Athenius of Cercina
 Aurilius of Kelibia
 Benantius of Oppidum Novum
 Collo 
 Crescens
 Dantus
 Eugenius of Carthage 
 Florentinus 
 Fortunatas and Optantius 
 Felix
 Fortunatianus of Cillium
 Frumentius
 Honartus of Tlemcen 
 Reparatus of Cissi
 Leporis of Azura
 Martialis of Columnata
 Maximus of Cova
 Petrus
 Peregrinus (bishop)
 Pudentius of Madauros, M'Daourouch
 Tacanus of Albulae
 Tiberianus of Quiza
 Rogatus
 Quintian, Lucius and Julian 
 Quodvultdeus of Coeliana
 Victor of Pomaria
 Victorian, Frumentius and Companions
 Vadius of Lesvi
 Vitalis of Castra Nova
 Bishop of Beniane, Tipasa, Bonusta, Macri.

See also
Notitia Dignitatum
Annuario Pontificio

References

Byzantine manuscripts
Lists of Roman Catholic bishops and archbishops
History of Christianity in North Africa
History of the Balearic Islands
History of Sardinia
Lists of Roman Catholic dioceses